Turks in Ireland are Turkish people who live in Ireland having been born elsewhere, or are Irish-born, but have Turkish roots. By Turkish roots, this could mean roots linking back to Turkey, the island of Cyprus or the communities of the Turkish diaspora.

Population 
According to the 2011 Irish census, there are 1,029 Turkish nationals living in Ireland. During the time of a 2005 strike against the GAMA Turkish Construction Company, socialist news websites reported that they alone employed 900 to 2,000 Turkish workers. The Turkish embassy may have an investment in down-playing the number of Turks in Ireland given the negative reception of Turks in other European countries, such as German Turks, Dutch-Turks and French-Turks. Thus, overall the number of Turkish descendants living in Ireland is estimated at 2,000-3,000.

According to the information from Turkish Foreign Ministry on 06/02/2019, there are 4500 Turkish citizens living in the Republic of Ireland.

Organisations and associations 
Irish Turkish Business Association, aims to promote the development of bilateral trade between Ireland and Turkey
Turkish Association of Ireland, aims to bring the Turkish community in Ireland together.
Turkish Irish Educational and Cultural Society (TIECS), aims to strengthen and advance the ties between the Turkish and Irish community.
Lucky Greywolf is the company responsible for the Turkish and other Turkish markets of language schools in Ireland.

Notable people 
Ahmet Dede, celebrity chef (Turkish origin)
Paul Güven, artist (Turkish, Turkish Cypriot and Irish origin)
Abs Breen, singer (Turkish father)
Billy Mehmet, football player (Turkish Cypriot father)
Joseph O'Neill, author (Turkish mother)
Ayla Peksoylu, singer (Turkish Cypriot father)
Erdal Eren BAYRAK, Entrepreneur (Turkish origin)

See also 
Irish–Turkish relations

References

Bibliography

Further reading

External links 

Turkish embassy in Ireland
Turkish farmers ‘fathered the Irish’
Turkish help to Irish
Turkish Help to Irish in the Great Hunger

Ireland
Ireland

Turkey
Muslim communities in Europe